Bollinger is an independent Champagne house from the Champagne region of France.

Bollinger may also refer to

Places
 Bolinger, Alabama, an unincorporated community in Choctaw County, Alabama
 Bollinger County, Missouri, a county of the US State of Missouri
 Bollinger Mill State Historic Site, a Missouri State Park.

Transportation
 Bollinger Motors, a New York startup that unveiled an all-electric sport utility truck in 2018; see LA Auto Show
 Bollinger Shipyards, builder of ships, workboats, and USCG cutters

Legal cases
 Gratz v. Bollinger, a case of the United States Supreme Court regarding the University of Michigan undergraduate affirmative action admissions policy in 2003.
 Grutter v. Bollinger, a case of the Supreme Court of the United States regarding the affirmative action admissions policy of the University of Michigan Law School in 2003.
Lee Bollinger was the president of University of Michigan at the time and the defendant in both cases.

Other uses
 Bollinger (surname)
 Bollinger Bands, a technical analysis tool invented by John Bollinger in the 1980s

See also

 Bolinger, a surname